The Czech Republic women's national under-19 football team is the national under-19 football team of Czech Republic and is governed by the Football Association of the Czech Republic (FAČR).

Competitive record

FIFA U-20 Women's World Cup

The team has never qualified for the  FIFA U-20 Women's World Cup.

UEFA Women's Under-19 Championship

Players

Previous squads

UEFA Women's Under-19 Championship
2022 UEFA Women's Under-19 Championship

References

External links
Official Team website
Official FAČR website
UEFA profile
Soccerway.com profile

Czech Republic national football team
Women's national under-19 association football teams
European women's national under-19 association football teams